Symphyotrichum simmondsii (formerly Aster simmondsii) is a species of flowering plant of the family Asteraceae endemic to the southeastern United States. Commonly known as Simmonds' aster, it is a colony-forming herbaceous perennial.

Description
The flowers have an average of 18–38pale lavender or lilac to pale purple petals, also called rays or ray florets. The flower centers, composed of disk florets, begin as yellow and become reddish as they mature. There are roughly 24–37disk florets, each with five lobes.

Distribution and habitat

Gallery

Citations

References

External links
Astereae Lab – University of Waterloo
Ladybird Johnson Wildflower Center, wildflower.org – Symphyotrichum simmondsii

simmondsii
Flora of the Southeastern United States
Plants used in traditional Native American medicine
Plants described in 1913
Taxa named by John Kunkel Small